Turid Leirvoll (born 24 June 1956 in Rogaland) is a Norwegian and Danish politician who was Party Secretary of the Norwegian Socialist Left Party from 1993 to 2001. She is the current Party Secretary of the Danish Socialist People's Party.

References 

1956 births
Living people
Socialist Left Party (Norway) politicians